Dead Heart in a Dead World is the fourth studio album by American heavy metal band Nevermore, released in October 2000. In a style comparable to a darker, heavier Queensrÿche, its songs range topics such as criticism of drug possession penalties to rejection of religion. The album also features a cover of Simon & Garfunkel's hit, "The Sound of Silence".  It is also notable for being Nevermore's first record utilizing seven-string guitars.

The album featured one single in the track "Believe in Nothing", which was covered by  All That Remains on their 2008 album, Overcome. It was also covered by Firewind in 2008, on the Century Media covers album "Covering 20 Years of Extremes".

The bonus track Chances Three had been previously recorded under the title Three Chances in a 1990 demo by Sanctuary, as well as with its current title in the 1992 Nevermore demo entitled Utopia.

Critical reception

In 2005, Dead Heart in a Dead World was ranked number 361 in Rock Hard magazine's book of The 500 Greatest Rock & Metal Albums of All Time.

Track listing

Bonus videos (2012 reissue)
 "Next in Line" (video) - 3:58
 "What Tomorrow Knows" (video) - 4:36

Limited edition live track list
 "The River Dragon Has Come"
 "Dead Heart in a Dead World"
 "Inside Four Walls"
 "Narcosynthesis"
 "The Heart Collector"
 "Engines of Hate"

Personnel

Band
 Warrel Dane - vocals
 Jeff Loomis - guitars
 Jim Sheppard - bass
 Van Williams - drums

Other
 Andy Sneap - production, engineering, mixing, mastering
 Justin Leeah - additional engineering
 Bobby Torres - additional engineering
 Travis Smith - illustrations, design, layout
 Karen Mason-Blair - band photography
 Neil Sussman - legal representation

Charts

References

External links
Official website

2000 albums
Nevermore albums
Century Media Records albums
Albums produced by Andy Sneap
Albums recorded at Robert Lang Studios
Albums with cover art by Travis Smith (artist)